"Ob-La-Di, Ob-La-Da" is a song by the English rock band the Beatles from their 1968 double album The Beatles (also known as "the White Album"). It was written by Paul McCartney and credited to the Lennon–McCartney partnership. Following the album's release, the song was issued as a single in many countries, although not in the United Kingdom or the United States, and topped singles charts in Australia, Japan, New Zealand, Switzerland and West Germany. When belatedly issued as a single in the United States in 1976, it peaked at number 49 on the Billboard Hot 100.

McCartney wrote "Ob-La-Di, Ob-La-Da" in a cod Jamaican ska style and appropriated a phrase popularised by Jimmy Scott, a London-based Nigerian musician, for the song's title and chorus. Following its release, Scott attempted, unsuccessfully, to receive a composing credit. The recording sessions for the track were marked by disharmony as McCartney's perfectionism tested his bandmates and their recording staff. The song was especially disliked by John Lennon, and a heated argument during one of the sessions led to Geoff Emerick quitting his job as the Beatles' recording engineer. A discarded early version of the track, featuring Scott on congas, was included on the band's 1996 compilation Anthology 3.

The Beatles' decision not to release the single in the UK or the US led to several cover recordings by other artists, who sought to achieve a chart hit with the song. Of these, Marmalade became the first Scottish group to have a number 1 hit in the UK when their version topped the Record Retailer chart in late 1968. Despite the song's popularity, "Ob-La-Di, Ob-La-Da" has been ridiculed by some commentators for its plain lightheartedness, and appeared in some lists of worst songs ever. Since 2009, McCartney has regularly performed the song in concert.

Background and inspiration
Paul McCartney began writing "Ob-La-Di, Ob-La-Da" during the Beatles' stay in Rishikesh, India, in early 1968. Prudence Farrow, one of their fellow Transcendental Meditation students there, recalled McCartney, John Lennon and George Harrison playing it to her in an attempt to lure her out of her room, where she had become immersed in intense meditation. McCartney wrote the song when reggae was becoming popular in Britain; author Ian MacDonald describes it as "McCartney's rather approximate tribute to the Jamaican ska idiom". The character of Desmond in the lyrics, from the opening line "Desmond has a barrow in the market-place", was a reference to reggae singer Desmond Dekker, who had recently toured the UK. The tag line "Ob-la-di, ob-la-da, life goes on, brah" was an expression used by Nigerian conga player Jimmy Scott-Emuakpor, an acquaintance of McCartney. According to Scott's widow, as part of his stage act with his band Ob-La-Di Ob-La-Da, Scott would call out "Ob la di", to which the audience would respond "Ob la da", and he would then conclude: "Life goes on."

After the release of "Ob-La-Di, Ob-La-Da" in November 1968, Scott tried to claim a writer's credit for the use of his catchphrase. McCartney said that the phrase was "just an expression", whereas Scott argued that it was not a common expression and was used exclusively by the Scott-Emuakpor family. McCartney was angry that the British press sided with Scott over the issue. According to researchers Doug Sulpy and Ray Schweighardt, in their study of the tapes from the Beatles' filmed rehearsals at Twickenham Film Studios in January 1969, McCartney complained bitterly to his bandmates about Scott's claim that he "stole" the phrase. Later in 1969, while in Brixton Prison awaiting trial for failing to pay maintenance to his ex-wife, Scott sent a request to the Beatles asking them to pay his legal bills. McCartney agreed to pay the amount on the condition that Scott abandon his attempt to receive a co-writer's credit.

Recording
The Beatles gathered at Harrison's Esher home in Surrey in May 1968, after their return from Rishikesh, to record demos for their upcoming project. "Ob-La-Di, Ob-La-Da" was one of the 27 demos recorded there. McCartney performed this demo solo, with only an acoustic guitar. He also double-tracked his vocal, which was not perfectly synchronised, creating an echoing effect.

The formal recording of "Ob-La-Di, Ob-La-Da" took place in July and involved several days of work. The first completed version of the track, recorded between 3 and 5 July, featured Scott playing congas and a trio of saxophonists. At McCartney's insistence, the band remade the song in an effort to capture the performance for which he was aiming. In doing so, according to Beatles historian Mark Lewisohn, "the Beatles were creating another first: the first time they had especially recruited session musicians and then rejected the recording."

Work began on the new version on 8 July. In the recollection of Geoff Emerick, the band's recording engineer, Lennon "openly and vocally detested" the song, calling it "more of Paul's 'granny music shit'", although at times he appeared enthusiastic, "acting the fool and doing his fake Jamaican patois". Having left the studio at one point, Lennon then returned under the influence of marijuana. Out of frustration at being made to continually work on the song, he went straight to the piano and played the opening chords louder and faster than before, in what MacDonald describes as a "mock music-hall" style. Lennon claimed that this was how the song should be played, and it became the version that the Beatles ended up using. McCartney nevertheless decided to remake the track once more. During the afternoon session on 9 July, the Beatles recorded a new basic track, which Lewisohn says possibly featured McCartney playing the drums instead of Ringo Starr. Despite this further work, McCartney conceded that the basic track from the previous day was adequate, and the band returned to the 8 July recording for overdubs during the evening session.

McCartney's perfectionism annoyed his bandmates, and when their producer, George Martin, offered him suggestions for his vocal part, McCartney rebuked him, saying, "Well you come down and sing it." According to Emerick, the usually placid Martin shouted in reply: "Then bloody sing it again! I give up. I just don't know any better how to help you." The following day, Emerick quit working for the group; he later cited this exchange between McCartney and Martin as one of the reasons, as well as the unpleasant atmosphere that had typified the White Album sessions up to that point.

In the final verse, McCartney made an error by singing, "Desmond stays at home and does his pretty face" (rather than Molly), and had Molly letting "the children lend a hand". This mistake was retained because the other Beatles liked it. Harrison and Lennon yell "arm" and "leg" between the lines "Desmond lets the children lend a hand" and "Molly stays at home".

The lyrics of Harrison's White Album track "Savoy Truffle" include the lines "We all know Ob-la-di-bla-da / But can you show me where you are?" Like Lennon, Harrison had been vocal in his dislike of "Ob-La-Di, Ob-La-Da". According to music journalist Robert Fontenot, the reference in "Savoy Truffle" was Harrison's way of conveying his opinion of McCartney's song.

Releases and live performances

"Ob-La-Di, Ob-La-Da" was released on The Beatles on 22 November 1968. As one of the most popular tracks on the album, it was also issued as a single, backed by "While My Guitar Gently Weeps", in many countries, although not in the main commercial markets of the UK and the United States. McCartney had wanted the single released in these two countries also, but his bandmates vetoed the idea. In November 1976, Capitol Records issued the song as a single in the US, with "Julia" as the B-side. The sleeves were white and individually numbered, as copies of the White Album had been. The discarded version of the song, known as "Take 5" and featuring Scott on congas, was released on the Anthology 3 compilation in 1996.

The first time the song was performed live by any of the Beatles was on 2 December 2009, when McCartney played it in Hamburg, Germany, on the first night of a European tour. Author Howard Sounes comments that, despite Lennon's derision of the song, it "went down a storm" in Hamburg – the city where the Beatles had honed their act in the early 1960s. McCartney included "Ob-La-Di, Ob-La-Da" in his set list for the 2009 tour and in the set list for tours he made through to 2012. He also performed it in front of Buckingham Palace for the Queen's Diamond Jubilee celebrations, then at San Francisco's Outside Lands concert on 9 August 2013. McCartney again featured the song in his set list for his 2013–15 Out There! tour and his 2016–17 One on One tour, as well as his 7 September 2018 Grand Central Terminal concert and his head-line appearance at the Glastonbury Festival in 2022.

Reception
"Ob-La-Di, Ob-La-Da" topped singles charts in West Germany, Austria, Switzerland, Australia, New Zealand and Japan over 1968–69. In 1969, Lennon and McCartney received an Ivor Novello Award for the song. When belatedly issued as a single in the US, in 1976, "Ob-La-Di, Ob-La-Da" peaked at number 49 on the Billboard Hot 100. According to author Steve Turner, it has been described as the first song in the "white ska" style. In Australia, where the song was part of a double A-side single (backed with the Harrison composition "While My Guitar Gently Weeps"), the record achieved sales of over 50,000 copies, being eligible for the award of a Gold Disc.

In his contemporary review of the White Album, for Rolling Stone, Jann Wenner called "Ob-La-Di, Ob-La-Da" "fun music for a fun song about fun", adding, "Who needs answers?" Record Mirrors reviewer said it was the album's "most pleasant and best recorded track" and praised the "chuck-chuck piano and drum sound". Nik Cohn, writing in The New York Times, gave the double LP an unfavourable review in which he criticised the Beatles for resorting to musical pastiche. He said that "Ob-La-Di, Ob-La-Da" was "mock-West Indies" and that like the album's other examples of "mock-[music]", "none of it works, it all loses out to the originals, it all sounds stale." The NMEs Alan Smith admired the "good-to-be-alive groove" and said the song was "a great personal favourite". He added: "Heard it once, can't stop. Hanclapping fun à la West Indies, sung with warmth by Paul ... This is going to be a smash [hit] for somebody ..."

Ian MacDonald described "Ob-La-Di, Ob-La-Da" as "one of the most spontaneous-sounding tracks on The Beatles" as well as the most commercial, but also a song filled with "desperate levity" and "trite by McCartney's standards". Conversely, Stephen Thomas Erlewine of AllMusic includes it among McCartney's "stunning" compositions on the album. Ian Fortnam of Classic Rock magazine groups it with "Martha My Dear", "Rocky Raccoon" and "Honey Pie" as examples of the "awful lot of sugar" McCartney contributed to the White Album, in an attempt to make it more "palatable" in response to Lennon's determination to include his eight-minute avant-garde piece "Revolution 9".

"Ob-La-Di, Ob-La-Da" is often the subject of ridicule. In 2004, it was included in Blender magazine's list titled "50 Worst Songs Ever!" and was voted the worst song of all time in an online poll organised by Mars. In 2012, the NMEs website editor, Luke Lewis, argued that the Beatles had recorded "a surprising amount of ropy old toss", and singled out "Ob-La-Di, Ob-La-Da" as "the least convincing cod-reggae skanking this side of the QI theme tune". That same year, Tom Rowley of The Daily Telegraph said the track was a "reasonable choice" for derision, following the result of the Mars poll, and it subsequently came second (behind "Revolution 9") in the Telegraphs poll to determine the worst Beatles song.

Personnel
According to Ian MacDonald and Mark Lewisohn:

The Beatles
 Paul McCartney – vocal, electric bass, acoustic bass, handclaps, vocal percussion
 John Lennon – piano, backing vocal, handclaps, vocal percussion
 George Harrison – acoustic guitar, backing vocal, handclaps, vocal percussion
 Ringo Starr – drums, bongos, maracas, other percussion, handclaps, vocal percussion

Additional musicians
 Three unnamed session players – saxophones
 George Martin – woodwind arrangement

Cover versions

Marmalade

The Beatles' decision not to issue "Ob-La-Di, Ob-La-Da" as a single in the UK or the US led to many acts rushing to record the song, in the hope of achieving a hit in those countries. A recording by the Scottish pop band Marmalade, released in late 1968, became the most commercially successful of all the cover versions of songs from The Beatles. It reached number 1 on the Record Retailer chart (subsequently the UK Singles Chart) in January 1969, making Marmalade the first Scottish artist to top that chart.

Marmalade's recording sold around half a million in the UK, and a million copies globally by April 1969. During the group's TV appearance on BBC One's Top of the Pops to promote the track, four of the five band members wore kilts; their English-born drummer instead dressed as a redcoat. Reflecting the song's popularity in the UK, according to author Alan Clayson, comedian Benny Hill included the band's name with Cream and Grapefruit in a sketch where a hungover radio disc jockey is continually confronted by phone-in requests that exacerbate his nausea.

Other artists
Aside from Marmalade, two other acts achieved hits in Europe with "Ob-La-Di, Ob-La-Da". In 1968, a recording by the Bedrocks, a West Indian band from Leeds, peaked at number 20 on the Record Retailer chart. In a discussion at Twickenham Studios in January 1969, McCartney and his girlfriend, Linda Eastman, said they both liked the Bedrocks' version best out of all the cover versions up to that point, including a recent single by Arthur Conley. Also in 1968, the Spectrum reached number 19 on the German singles chart with their cover.

Happy Mondays included "Desmond", which used part of the melody from "Ob-La-Di, Ob-La-Da", on their debut album Squirrel and G-Man Twenty Four Hour Party People Plastic Face Carnt Smile (White Out), released in 1987. Partly through the involvement of Michael Jackson, who owned the Beatles' Northern Songs catalogue, the track was removed from later pressings of the album because of the strong similarity.

A version of "Ob-La-Di, Ob-La-Da" by Patti LuPone and the cast of Life Goes On was the theme tune for the 1989–1993 drama of that name on ABC in the United States. The DVD release has a replacement theme song at the beginning of each episode, with the exception of the show's pilot. The replacement was due to high licensing costs for the Beatles' song.

Gabriela Bee posted a cover version of the song on YouTube in 2019. By January 2023, the song had earned 37 million views.

The melody was used for the Sinhala song "Kodi Gaha Yata Mama Upanne" sung by MS Fernando and HR Jothipala in the 1971 Sri Lankan comedy Hathara Denama Soorayo

Chart history

The Beatles version

Marmalade version

Certifications

See also
 Nonsense song

Notes

References

Sources

External links
 
 
 

The Beatles songs
1968 songs
1968 singles
Apple Records singles
Songs written by Lennon–McCartney
Song recordings produced by George Martin
Songs published by Northern Songs
1976 singles
Capitol Records singles
UK Singles Chart number-one singles
Number-one singles in Australia
Number-one singles in Austria
Number-one singles in Germany
Number-one singles in Switzerland
Number-one singles in Norway
Number-one singles in New Zealand
Irish Singles Chart number-one singles
Oricon International Singles Chart number-one singles
Marmalade (band) songs
CBS Records singles
Columbia Records singles
Ska songs
Songs about marriage
Songs involved in plagiarism controversies
Song recordings produced by Mike Smith (British record producer)